Holy Myrrhbearers Cathedral (Azerbaijani: Müqəddəs Mürdaşıyan Zənənlər Başkilsəsi) is a Russian Orthodox cathedral in Baku, Azerbaijan. The church is dedicated to the Holy Myrrhbearers, who are commemorated on the second Sunday after Pascha (Easter).

History
By 1907, the question arose of improving the accommodation for the soldiers and officers of the 206th Salyan Infantry Regiment - the barracks were scattered throughout the city by that time, and the officers lived in rented apartments also in different parts of the city, where they managed to find suitable housing. The issue was resolved in St. Petersburg in the highest commission for the construction of barracks established under the Military Council on appropriations for construction, the Baku Military Construction Commission inspected the outskirts of the city to select free plots of land for construction and stopped at the area where the Academy of Sciences of Azerbaijan is now located. However, the place was reconsidered and relocated to the outskirts. 

The project was financed by Ministry of War of the Russian Empire and entrusted to the architect Fyodor Verzhbitsky. Groundbreaking started on 19 May 1908 (Julian calendar: 10 May 1908) and construction finished on 22 December 1909. It was consecrated by temporary exarch of Georgia and Bishop of Baku, Gregory (Vakhnin) under the name Regimental Church of the Archangel Michael of the 206th Salyan Infantry Regiment on 16 December 1909. The consecration ceremony was attended by important members of society like Zeynalabdin Taghiyev, Ismayil bek Safaraliyev, Mammad Hasan Hajinski and Stepan Taghionosov, as well as representatives of the Armenian, Muslim and Jewish clergy.

In 1920, it was one of the first places of religious worship to be closed down as a result of Sovietization. It was used first as a warehouse and later as a gymnasium, finally as barracks for paratroopers in 1989-1990. During the Black January of 1990, it was hit by missiles fired by the Soviet troops, and the building was severely damaged. Later on March 2, it was burned due to an accident.

The building was returned to the Russian Orthodox Church during tenure of Ayaz Mutallibov, in 1991. With the financial aid provided by the Azerbaijani-born Russian entrepreneur Aydin Gurbanov, the building was fully restored by 2000. On 27 May 2001, Patriarch Alexius II elevated the church's status to that of a cathedral.

The Holy Myrrhbearers Cathedral holds on to a shrine with the relics of St. Bartholomew the Apostle, who is believed to have been crucified near the Maiden Tower in what is now downtown Baku, Azerbaijan.

See also
Alexander Nevsky Cathedral, Baku
Church of Michael Archangel, Baku

References

External links
 The Holy Myrrhbearers Cathedral in Baku. Eparchy of Baku and the Caspian region (official website).

Christian organizations established in 1909
Russian Orthodox cathedrals in Asia
Eastern Orthodox churches in Azerbaijan
Churches completed in 1909
20th-century Eastern Orthodox church buildings
Churches in Baku
Cathedrals in Baku
Russian Orthodox Church in Azerbaijan